Ashley Marie Santos (born June 9, 1993) is an American actress. She is known for playing Emily in the eighth season of FX horror anthology series American Horror Story, entitled Apocalypse (2018).

Early life 
Ashley Marie Santos was born in The Bronx, New York. Her father is Dominicanher mother is Dominican. She was raised in Montgomery, New York, where she discovered her love for sports. She always expressed an interest in acting, and after relocating to Salt Lake City, Utah, she started her acting career. In April 2018 she transitioned her career to Los Angeles, CA.

Filmography

Film

Television

References

External links
 

Living people
1993 births
Actresses from New York City
People from the Bronx
American people of Dominican Republic descent
Hispanic and Latino American actresses
American actresses of Puerto Rican descent
American television actresses
American film actresses